Salvatore "Sal" Murdocca (born April 26, 1943) is an American children's book illustrator. He is best known as Sal Murdocca, illustrator of the Magic Tree House series written by Mary Pope Osborne (from 1992) and the nonfiction Magic Tree House Fact Checkers by Osborne and collaborators (from 2000)—about 50 and 30 volumes respectively to 2014.

Murdocca grew up in Brooklyn, New York, and attended the High School of Art and Design in New York City, majoring in illustration.  After graduating in 1960, he spent another year studying at the Art Students League while apprenticing in a commercial art studio.

After a successful nine-year career as an advertising and magazine illustrator, Mr. Murdocca gradually turned to children's book illustration.

Since 1970, Mr. Murdocca has authored ten books and illustrated hundreds of education, mass market, and trade books. He has illustrated books by such noted authors as Elizabeth Winthrop (Dancing Granny, Marshall Cavendish, 2003), Eve Bunting, Bill Martin Jr., Olivia Newton-John, Charles Grodin, Alan Benjamin, Laura Numeroff, Edward Packard, Jeanne Bendick, and Mary Pope Osborne.

He has also illustrated several series, including George E. Stanley's Third-Grade Detectives, Scaredy Cats, and Mary Pope Osborne's Magic Tree House series.

In the early 1980s, Mr. Murdocca taught writing and illustration for two years at the Parsons School of Design.
He has written the libretto for an opera inspired by his own book, The Hero of Hamblett, published in 1972.

His art work has been recognized by The Society of Illustrators, the Art Director's Club in NYC and the Children's Book Council. His writing has been recognized by the Literary Guild.  He was a winner in an international short story competition in 1978.

Mr. Murdocca is also an award-winning fine artist who has participated in many one-man and group shows of his watercolor and acrylic paintings. His fine art has been represented by galleries in Nyack, NY, SOHO, NYC, and in France.

External links
 Salvatore Murdocca at Simon & Schuster
 S&S is the publisher of Third-Grade Detectives by George E. Stanley (10 volumes) and Landry News by Andrew Clements
 

Living people
1943 births
American children's book illustrators
People from Brooklyn
Art Students League of New York alumni
Place of birth missing (living people)
High School of Art and Design alumni